Route 28 is a  nominally south–north state highway in the U.S. state of Massachusetts, running from the town of Eastham via Boston to the New Hampshire state line in Methuen. Following the route from its nominally southern end, Route 28 initially heads south to the town of Chatham then turns west to follow along the south shore of Cape Cod. In Falmouth, Route 28 turns north and continues through the western part of Plymouth County and the eastern part of Norfolk County; it then passes through downtown Boston before heading north via Lawrence to the New Hampshire state line, where it continues as New Hampshire Route 28.

Route 28 was originally formed as a New England interstate route established in 1922 to run from Buzzards Bay to New Hampshire. The route itself was overlaid on several early turnpike roads constructed in the early 19th century. Except for an extension into Cape Cod in 1926, the overall highway layout and routing is largely unchanged from its original design. Route 28 has been realigned in several places when newer, higher quality roads were built.

Route 28 is supplanted by interstate highways throughout most of the state, and is used mainly as a secondary and local highway. Throughout Cape Cod, particularly in Hyannis and Yarmouth, it passes through heavy development and is the primary navigation route along the south side of the Cape. This causes congestion and gridlock, especially during the summer months, when traffic is at its heaviest.

Route description

Route 28 is a mostly a two-lane undivided highway, with several divided, four-lane sections in populated areas as well as two short freeway sections. The south end of Route 28 is at the Orleans Rotary just north of the Orleans-Eastham town line, where it intersects with U.S. Route 6 and Route 6A. Northbound Route 28 initially heads south towards the town of Chatham before turning west to run along the south shore of Cape Cod until Falmouth. From there, Route 28 turns north, running for several miles along a freeway, later downgrading to a four-lane divided surface arterial. Route 28 crosses the Cape Cod Canal via the Bourne Bridge, from which it then overlaps with U.S. Route 6 as a two-lane highway until Wareham. North of Wareham, Route 28 heads north towards Boston passing through the southern suburbs of the city, including Middleborough, Bridgewater, Brockton, and Randolph. After crossing Interstate 93, Route 28 then goes through the Blue Hills Reservation and Milton before crossing into Boston over the Neponset River. 28 starts on Blue Hill Avenue and transfers to Seaver Street which turns into Columbus Avenue. It then transfers to Tremont St, Melnea Cass Blvd, and back into Columbus Avenue. In Boston proper, northbound Route 28 uses Columbus Avenue, Stuart Street, Charles Street South, and Beacon Street, then shifts via the David G. Mugar Way to Embankment Road. As Stuart Street and Charles Street South are both one way, the southbound routing runs west on Beacon Street from Mugar Way to Clarendon Street, where it turns south, meets routes 2 and 9, until it reaches Columbus Avenue. At the junction with the Longfellow Bridge, Route 28 is joined briefly by Route 3 on a wrong-way concurrency until the Charles River Dam Bridge. Route 28 crosses the Charles River on the Charles River Dam Bridge into Cambridge. After crossing the river, Route 28 runs along the six-lane divided highway known as Monsignor O'Brien Highway (in Cambridge) and McGrath Highway (in Somerville) to connect to the Fellsway. Roughly half of the McGrath Highway is an elevated freeway through East Somerville, while being supplemented by at-grade frontage roads. The four-lane Fellsway crosses the Mystic River into Medford. Route 28 continues north through the Middlesex Fells Reservation and the northern suburbs of Boston, including Reading, Andover, Lawrence (crossing the Merrimack River via the O'Leary Bridge), and Methuen, from which it then crosses into the state of New Hampshire.

History

Early turnpikes
Many of the roads leading from Boston to the surrounding towns were first laid out as privately owned and operated turnpikes at the beginning of the 19th century. One of the roads used by modern Route 28 leading from the northern suburbs of Boston in the direction of Manchester, New Hampshire was the Andover and Medford Turnpike. The turnpike corporation was chartered in June 1805 and had authority to build from the marketplace in Medford to a point in the town of Andover. A committee of Middlesex County freeholders established the location of the road in 1806, and the road was constructed soon after at a cost of almost $49,000 for a length of about six miles, being built only as far north as the Reading-Stoneham town line, where a branch of the Essex Turnpike continued the road to Andover and the state of New Hampshire. An act by the General Court in February 1807 allowed the Andover and Medford company to maintain a toll gate at the Essex-Middlesex county line jointly with the Essex Turnpike corporation. The road continued collecting tolls until January 1836 when Middlesex county commissioners declared the road a public road and awarded the company $3,000 as compensation.

In March 1804, another turnpike corporation, the Blue Hill Turnpike Corporation, was chartered with authority to lay out an improved road from the meeting house in the town of Randolph, through the Blue Hills Reservation, to a point in the town of Milton. A second act in June 1805 allowed for a slight alteration in the terminus in Milton. The road cost approximately $78,300 to build the eight miles from Randolph Center to Milton Lower Mills in 1805. The turnpike used what is now North Main Street in Randolph and Randolph Avenue in Milton. The road from Milton Lower Mills into Boston was continued by the Dorchester Turnpike. In 1815, the Blue Hills Turnpike company was allowed to impose a fine on any persons who tried to avoid paying the tolls. The turnpike was discontinued in 1848, when the Norfolk county commissioners declared the road as a public highway. The company reported an average net income of 1-2 per cent per year during its existence.

Two other sections of modern Route 28 were also parts of early turnpikes. The section between Middleborough and Bridgewater, where Route 28 overlaps with Route 18, was part of the New Bedford and Bridgewater Turnpike. The portion along Blue Hill Avenue, between the village of Mattapan and Franklin Park Zoo, was the northern half of the Brush Hill Turnpike (the lower half is modern Route 138). In Cape Cod, most travel was by water and roads were not improved until late in the 19th century.

Route numbering and original alignment
In 1922, the New England states adopted a region-wide road marking system. Primary routes were to be assigned route numbers between 1 and 99 and marked as black numerals on yellow bands painted on poles along the route. The route running from Wareham, Massachusetts and Ossipee, New Hampshire via Boston and Manchester, New Hampshire was designated as New England Route 28. Route 28 utilized the main road between Wareham and Middleborough (Wareham Street), from which it then traveled along Everett Street and Summer Street until the center of Bridgewater. From Bridgewater, Route 28 used the main road to Brockton (Main Street). In Brockton, Route 28 shifted slightly west to use Warren Avenue (between Clifton and Pleasant streets) and North Main Street (to the town of Avon). From Randolph, it then went along the alignment of the old Blue Hill Turnpike but left the turnpike alignment before reaching Milton Village, shifting westward to a section of the Brush Hill Turnpike (Blue Hill Avenue) in Mattapan. In Mattapan, it joined with New England Route 6 (modern Route 203) and went west along Morton Street and the Arborway until they met with New England Route 1 at Centre Street in Jamaica Plain.

The triple-concurrency of Routes 1, 6, and 28 continued through the Emerald Necklace following the Jamaicaway, the Riverway, and a short section of Boylston Street to Charlesgate, and then crossed the Charles River using the Harvard Bridge. After crossing the river, Route 6 split off to the west along Memorial Drive, while Routes 1 and 28 followed local streets in Cambridge and Somerville (Windsor Avenue, Webster Avenue, Walnut Street) to reach the Fellsway. The two routes crossed the Mystic River on the Fellsway and split at the intersection with the Revere Beach Parkway. From there, Route 28 continued along the Fellsway towards Medford Center. North of Medford, Route 28 utilized the alignment of the old Andover and Medford Turnpike through the Middlesex Fells Reservation into Reading. It then continued on the Andover branch of the old Essex Turnpike through Andover and Lawrence to the New Hampshire state line.

The route in Cape Cod was also assigned in 1922 as a primary New England route. The road from Bourne to Orleans along the south shore of the Cape was the easternmost section of New England Route 3.

At the end of 1926, the U.S. Highway system was established and several of the primary New England routes were redesignated as U.S. routes. New England Route 28 was not renumbered but New England Route 1 became U.S. Route 1; New England Route 6 became U.S. Route 3 north of Boston and mostly State Route 3 south of Boston; and New England Route 3 became mostly U.S. Route 6. In Cape Cod, however, this was not the case. Former New England Route 3 was assigned as a southern extension of Route 28, while former New England Route 6 was assigned as an eastern extension of U.S. Route 6.

Realignments
Driving the entire length from New Hampshire to Orleans, the highway layout and design has not changed much since its construction and designation in the early 20th century. The major exceptions are in Boston, where some of the original routing was changed over the years, and on the Cape, where a freeway section between Falmouth and Bourne was completed in the mid-1960s.

In 1928, several projects to relieve congestion in the Boston area were completed. One of these was the opening of the Boston University Bridge (at the time known as Cottage Farm Bridge). The opening of this new bridge over the Charles River resulted in the relocation of the triple concurrency of US 1, US 3, and Route 28 onto it. The routes left the Riverway using Park Drive and Mountfort Street (both now designated as part of Route 2) to reach the bridge. In Cambridge and Somerville, a new boulevard known as the Northern Artery was built over part of Somerville Avenue and Medford Street, continuing north on a new roadway cutting across Somerville to Fellsway East, which was also paved over by the new Northern Artery. The Northern Artery provided a high speed connection between the Charles River and the Mystic River. US 1 and Route 28 were relocated off of local streets in Cambridge and Somerville onto the Northern Artery when it opened to traffic. From the Boston University Bridge, the two routes used Memorial Drive and Cambridge Parkway to reach the Northern Artery. The Northern Artery was later renamed as the Monsignor O'Brien Highway in Cambridge and the McGrath Highway in Somerville.

In the mid-1930s, the city of Boston marked several alternate routes of Routes 1, 9, 28, and 37 that ran through the downtown area. Route C28 left mainline Route 28 by continuing north into Dorchester along Blue Hill Avenue instead of turning west onto Morton Street with Route 3. Just beyond the Franklin Zoo, C28 turned west along Seaver Street, continuing through Roxbury along Columbus Avenue. C28 then followed Columbus Avenue up to Charles Street at the Boston Common, turning north along Charles Street to Cambridge Street, then crossing the Charles River using the Longfellow Bridge. C28 met back with mainline Route 28 at Memorial Drive in Cambridge. In 1971, the Boston 'C' routes were retired and mainline Route 28 was relocated onto the former C28 alignment through downtown Boston. Route 28 was also later shifted to use its modern alignment along Embankment Road and the Charles River Dam Bridge.

The McCarthy Overpass, which carries Route 28 as McGrath Highway through part of Somerville, was built in the early 1950s, before Interstate 93. The parallel Northern Expressway segment connecting Medford (where I-93 ended in 1963) and the Central Artery was constructed between 1965 and 1973. The southbound off-ramp to Somerville Avenue, and a northbound "tunnel" under the overpass north of Somerville Avenue, were closed on April 11, 2016.

In 1935, a new bridge over the Cape Cod Canal, the Bourne Bridge, was opened to traffic, replacing an earlier drawbridge at the same location. Between 1941 and 1943, the road south of the Bourne Bridge was widened to a four-lane, divided highway to the Pocasset Rotary and renamed General MacArthur Boulevard. The Route 28 expressway in Falmouth opened to traffic in 1961. Route 28 was relocated to the new expressway soon after, with the former surface alignment being renumbered to Route 28A.

Around 1940, several minor realignments had also taken place in Brockton, Bridgewater, and Middleborough. In Brockton, Route 28 followed Montello Street instead of Warren Avenue. South of Bridgewater, Route 28 was relocated onto an overlap with Route 18 until West Grove Street. Route 28 then followed West Grove Street and East Grove Street, bypassing Middleborough Center to the south. By 1951, a new bypass road in Buzzards Bay was completed and resulted in the relocation of Routes 6 and 28 to the new roadway.

Route 28 itself is no longer utilized as a long distance through route because of the opening of several parallel expressways along the Route 28 corridor since the 1950s. Interstate 93 serves the Route 28 corridor north of Boston, while the combination of Route 24, the southern end of Interstate 495, and Route 25 serves the corridor south of Boston to the Bourne Bridge. The construction of Route 25, in particular, resulted in a reconfiguration of the connection from the Bourne Corners traffic circle to the Route 25 expressway.

Major intersections

Route 28A

Route 28A is a  alternate route running from Falmouth in the south to the village of Pocasset in the north. Route 28A parallels the freeway section of Route 28 in the Upper Cape, providing a scenic alternative for travelers and direct access to the localities bypassed by the freeway. Route 28A begins and ends at Route 28 with an intermediate junction with Route 151.

The highway was part of Route 28 until paralleling General MacArthur Boulevard expressway opened to traffic in 1961.

Major intersections

Miscellanea
 Directional signs on Route 28 on Cape Cod are continuously marked as north–south, which is confusing for unfamiliar drivers. One travelling on Route 28 southbound is actually going northeast from Falmouth to Mashpee, east from Mashpee to Chatham, and north from Chatham to the Orleans-Eastham border. In fact, where Route 39 hits Route 28 in South Orleans, the directions on Route 28 are unsigned, since otherwise a driver heading north on 39 North and wishing to continue north into Orleans Center might inadvertently follow 28 North south to Chatham.
 Route 28 traverses through the town of Avon, geographically one of the ten smallest municipalities in Massachusetts, between Brockton and Randolph to the south and north, respectively, at roughly mile marker 104. In spite of Avon's diminutive size (Route 28 passes through Avon for only 1.55 mi/2.50 km), sections of Route 28 through the aforementioned town are also known as Memorial Drive, East Main Street, on which Avon's Town Hall is located, and North Main Street.
 Route 28 running between Interstate 93 in Randolph (wrong-way concurrency with MA Route 128 officially until 1997) and Chickatawbut Road in Milton, to the south and north respectively, traverses through the city of Quincy at approximately mile marker 111. The short Quincy stretch is located entirely within the Blue Hills Reservation and is completely forested, with no residential or commercial development. As is the case in Milton south of Reedsdale Road, the Quincy section of Route 28 is also officially known as Randolph Avenue.
 In West Yarmouth near Seaview Ave, Route 28 is incorrectly signed as US route 28 instead of Massachusetts Route 28. It is also incorrectly signed as US 28 in Dennis just after the Bass River Bridge.
aProposed MassDOT milepost exit numbers that were to be added to interchanges along the MA 28 expressway as part of its project to convert all the state's exit numbers to those based on milepost numbers starting in 2016. However, this project has now been indefinitely postponed by MassDOT.

See also

 Route 28 (New England)

References

Further reading
 

028
Transportation in Barnstable County, Massachusetts
Transportation in Essex County, Massachusetts
Transportation in Middlesex County, Massachusetts
Transportation in Norfolk County, Massachusetts
Transportation in Plymouth County, Massachusetts
Transportation in Suffolk County, Massachusetts
Transportation in Boston
Transportation in Somerville, Massachusetts
1922 establishments in Massachusetts